Nancy Camille Taylor-Rosenberg (July 9, 1946 in Dallas, TX – October 3, 2017 in Las Vegas, NV) was an American writer. She attended school at Gulf Park and resided last in Las Vegas. 

Her first novel, Mitigating Circumstances, was published in 1993, and the film rights were obtained by director Jonathan Demme. Rosenberg's novels have been translated into many languages. The majority of her novels have been New York Times bestsellers.

Rosenberg was known for her philanthropic efforts. She received national acclaim for her writing program for inner city youth called "Voice of Tomorrow". The Board of Supervisors of Orange County voted her "A Woman of Excellence, Learning for Life" in 1994. She was featured on Prime Time Live and in People magazine for her adoption of a child with a rare, terminal illness called methylmalonic acidemia (MMA).

Bibliography
Probation Officer Carolyn Sullivan
Sullivan's Law (Kensington Books 5/2004)
Sullivan's Justice (Kensington Books 5/2005)
Sullivan's Evidence (Kensington Books 5/2006, 
Revenge of Innocents (Kensington Books 5/2007)
Lily Forrester (ADA, later Judge)
Mitigating Circumstances (Dutton Books 1/1993)
Buried Evidence (Hyperion Books 9/2000)
The Cheater (Forge Books 6/2009, 
My Lost Daughter (Forge Books 9/2010, 
Standalones
Interest of Justice (1993)
First Offense (1994)
Trial by Fire (1995)
California Angel (1995)
Abuse of Power (1997)
Conflict of Interest (2002)

References

External links
 Nancy Taylor Rosenberg Official Website
 Fantastic Fiction
 My Space

1946 births
Writers from Texas
Living people